Tacola may refer to:

 Cloud Chief, Oklahoma, a small unincorporated community in Washita County, Oklahoma, United States
 Tacola (butterfly), a brush-footed butterfly genus in the Limenitidinae
 The Tacola sheep, a breed of Italian sheep

See also
Taccola, Mariano di Jacopo (1382 – c. 1453), Italian polymath